Christopher Donald Cordner (born 30 December 1949) is an Australian philosopher and Associate Professor of Philosophy at the  University of Melbourne.
He is known for his expertise on ethics.
Cordner is a recipient of the Rhodes Scholarship (1972).

Books
 Ethical Encounter: The Depth of Moral Meaning (Swansea Studies in Philosophy), Palgrave Macmillan UK, 2001, 
 Philosophy, Ethics, and a Common Humanity: Essays in Honour of Raimond Gaita (ed.), Routledge, 2011,

References

External links
Christopher Cordner at the University of Melbourne

Living people
1949 births
21st-century Australian philosophers
20th-century Australian philosophers
Analytic philosophers
Philosophy academics
University of Melbourne alumni
Alumni of the University of Oxford
Academic staff of the University of Melbourne
Australian Rhodes Scholars